The  (Church of the Redeemer) is the oldest Lutheran church in Schwabing, part of Munich, Bavaria, Germany. It was built from 1899 to 1901 on a design by Theodor Fischer, in a style combining historicism and Jugendstil.

History 
The Lutheran congregation in predominantly Catholic Schwabing had only a small  (prayer house). A church was planned to accommodate a growing population in the still rural suburb, where Wassily Kandinsky, Paul Klee and Thomas Mann lived. It was designed by Theodor Fischer who followed the model of a classical basilica such as St. Anna im Lehel. The style recalls historicism, but includes Jugendstil decoration and shows a tendency to clearer modern structure. The architect, who designed the first church in his career, planned  ("a true Protestant church, first of all a hall for the sermon, to make the word come alive").

The pulpit is a central element of the interior. The altar is in focus in a richly decorated apse. The church was consecrated on 6 October 1901. In 1976, the altar was moved forward, closer to the congregation. Today the church is located at the Münchner Freiheit, a prominent location in the cityscape.

Features 
The altar and the pulpit are made from yellowish marble from Verona. The large painting in the apsis was created by Linda Kögel. Jesus on a throne, surrounded by angels, sits above scenes from parish life such as baptism, wedding and funeral, with portraits of parish members at the time.

A second organ was built by Rieger Orgelbau on the west gallery in 1990. It has three manuals and pedals with 43 stops.

References

Literature

External links 

 
 
 Blatt 98, design by Fischer, in the Architekturmuseum der Technischen Universität Berlin
 Blatt 99, design by Fischer, in the Architekturmuseum der Technischen Universität Berlin

Churches in Munich
Churches completed in the 1900s
Lutheran churches in Bavaria
Cultural heritage monuments in Munich